= International Year of Mobilization against Racism, Racial Discrimination, Xenophobia and Related Intolerance =

The year 2001 was declared the International Year of Mobilization against Racism, Racial Discrimination, Xenophobia and Related Intolerance by the United Nations General Assembly.

The United Nations International Years, beginning with the World Refugee Year in 1959/1960, are designated in order to focus world attention on important issues. The decision to devote the year 2001 to mobilization against racism and xenophobia was taken by the General Assembly on December 9, 1998, and was linked to the decision to organize a conference, the World Conference Against Racism, Racial Discrimination, Xenophobia and Related Intolerance, in the same year. In its resolution (A/RES/53/132) the General Assembly stated that the observance was "aimed at drawing the world’s attention to the objectives of the World Conference and giving new momentum to the political commitment to the elimination of all forms of racism, racial discrimination, xenophobia and related intolerance".

The conference was held in Durban, South Africa. 7,000 representatives from civil society participated in an NGO Forum from August 28 to 31, 2001. The governmental meeting was held from August 31 to September 7, 2001. A declaration and programme of action was adopted on September 8. United Nations High Commissioner for Human Rights Mary Robinson was the Secretary-General of the conference.
